Khustup is a mountain located in the southern Syunik Province of Armenia, to the south of Kapan. The height of the mountain is 3,206 meters. The source of the Vachagan River is located at the northern edge of Mount Khustup.

The Armenian national hero and military leader Garegin Nzhdeh is buried on the slopes of Mount Khustup.

References 

Mountains of Armenia
Geography of Syunik Province